Izi (also Romanized as Īzī and Eyzī) is a village in Azari Rural District, in the Central District of Esfarayen County, North Khorasan Province, Iran. At the 2006 census, its population was 379, in 94 families.

References 

Populated places in Esfarayen County